This is a list of cities in the United States by elevation. In the United States, settlements above 7,000 feet are found in the West.

Cities and towns above 

Note: Alma, Colorado, is the highest when considering only areas with permanent residents.  Using administrative boundaries as a measure, not settled areas, in 2006, Winter Park, Colorado became the highest incorporated town due to its annexation of a ski area.

References

Elevation
cities in the United States by elevation
U.S. cities